The first round of qualifying matches for the 2010 FIFA World Cup in the CONCACAF section featured the 22 teams ranked 14 to 35 on the FIFA ranking for CONCACAF as of May 2007. The teams ranked 14th to 24th were randomly drawn against the teams ranked 25th to 35th. The draw took place on 25 November 2007 in Durban, South Africa. The top 13 CONCACAF teams received a bye and advanced directly to the second round.

Format 
In this round, there were 11 matches and the winners advanced to the second round. All games were played in home and away format, except three ties: Puerto Rico–Dominican Republic, Grenada–U.S. Virgin Islands and Montserrat–Suriname, which were played over one leg in late March due to several Member Associations failing to meet the new FIFA Stadium standards and being unable to secure a home venue.

Teams

Group 1

Group 1A 

Barbados won 2–1 on aggregate and advanced to play United States in the Second Round.

Group 1B 

Saint Lucia won 3–2 on aggregate and advanced to play Guatemala in the Second Round.

Group 1C 

Bermuda won 4–2 on aggregate and advanced to play Trinidad and Tobago in the Second Round.

Group 1D 

Antigua and Barbuda won 4–0 on aggregate and advanced to play Cuba in the Second Round.

Group 2

Group 2A 

Belize won 4–2 on aggregate and advanced to play Mexico in the Second Round.

Group 2B 

3–3 on aggregate. Bahamas advanced on the away goals rule to play Jamaica in the Second Round.

Group 2C 

Puerto Rico advanced to play Honduras in the Second Round. This tie was played as a one leg tie in Puerto Rico, as the Dominican Republic failed to meet FIFA's new stadium standards and was unable to secure a home venue.

Group 2D 
No matches in this round. Saint Vincent and the Grenadines were drawn to play Canada in the Second Round.

Group 3

Group 3A 

Grenada advanced to play Costa Rica in the Second Round. This tie was played as a one leg tie in Grenada, as the U.S. Virgin Islands failed to meet FIFA's new stadium standards and was unable to secure a home venue.

Group 3B 

Suriname advanced to play Guyana in the Second Round. This tie was played as a one leg tie in Trinidad and Tobago, because neither side were able to provide a suitable venue according to FIFA's guidelines.

Group 3C 

El Salvador won 16–0 on aggregate and advanced to play Panama in the Second Round.

Group 3D 

Netherlands Antilles won 3–0 on aggregate and advanced to play Haiti in the Second Round.

Goalscorers 
A total of 68 goals were scored over 19 games, for an average of 3.58 goals per game.

6 goals
 Rudis Corrales

4 goals

 Ronald Cerritos
 Ricky Charles

2 goals

 Deon McCauley
 Devaun DeGraff
 Anadale Williams
 Shawn Martin
 Jason Roberts
 Kenzo Huur
 Wensley Christoph

1 goal

 Gayson Gregory
 George Dublin
 Okeem Challenger
 Demont Mitchell
 Lesly St. Fleur
 Michael Bethel
 Dwayne Stanford
 Rashida Williams
 Elroy Smith
 Harrison Roches
 Kwame Steede
 Tyrell Burgess
 Rohan Lennon
 Allean Grant
 Marshall Forbes
 Richard Pacquette
 Carlos Monteagudo
 Eliseo Quintanilla
 Emerson Umaña
 William Torres
 Dorset Langiagne
 Shane Rennie
 Byron Bubb
 Vladimir Farrell
 Angelo Zimmerman
 Anton Jongsma
 Tyrone Loran
 Petter Villegas
 Gerard Williams
 Orlando Mitchum
 Gilbert Nyhime
 Kenwin McPhee
 Titus Elva
 Cleon Wondel
 Melvin Valies
 Raydell Schuurman
 David Lowery
 Gavin Glinton

1 own goal
 Dario Sierra (against Antigua and Barbuda)
 Dwight Ferguson (against Grenada)

Notes

References

External links
FIFA.com

1
World Cup